Sundori is a 1979 Bangladeshi feature film directed by Amjad Hossain. The film won Bangladesh National Film Award in 8 categories including Best Supporting Actor, Best Supporting Actress, Best Music Director, Best Lyrics, Best Male Playback Singer, Best Female Playback Singer, Best Cinematography and Best Dialogue.

Cast
 Bobita
 Ilias Kanchan
 Saifuddin Ahmed
 Anwar Hossain
 Anwara Begum
 Jashim

Awards
Bangladesh National Film Awards
 Bangladesh National Film Award for Best Supporting Actor
 Bangladesh National Film Award for Best Supporting Actress
 Bangladesh National Film Award for Best Music Director
 Bangladesh National Film Award for Best Lyrics
 Bangladesh National Film Award for Best Male Playback Singer
 Bangladesh National Film Award for Best Female Playback Singer
 Bangladesh National Film Award for Best Dialogue

References

External links
 

1979 romantic drama films
1979 films
Bangladeshi romantic drama films
Bengali-language Bangladeshi films
Films scored by Alauddin Ali
1970s Bengali-language films
Films directed by Amjad Hossain